Deleni may refer to several places in Romania:

 Deleni, Constanța
 Deleni, Iași
 Deleni, Vaslui
 Deleni, a village in Helegiu Commune, Bacău County
 Deleni, a village in Scorțoasa Commune, Buzău County
 Deleni, a village in Petreștii de Jos Commune, Cluj County
 Deleni, a village in Șimnicu de Sus Commune, Dolj County
 Deleni, a village in Plopșoru Commune, Gorj County
 Deleni, a village in Zam Commune, Hunedoara County
 Deleni, a village in Ciortești Commune, Iași County
 Deleni, a village in Breznița-Motru Commune, Mehedinţi County
 Deleni, a village in Băgaciu Commune, Mureș County
 Deleni, a village in Ideciu de Jos Commune, Mureș County
 Deleni, a village in Pogăceaua Commune, Mureș County
 Deleni, a village in Ștefan cel Mare Commune, Neamț County
 Deleni, a village in Teslui Commune, Olt County
 Deleni, a village in Dobrin Commune, Sălaj County
 Deleni, a village in Pârteștii de Jos Commune, Suceava County
 Deleni, a village in Hoceni Commune, Vaslui County
 Deleni, a village in Stoenești Commune, Vâlcea County

Rivers in Romania:
Deleni (Mureș), a tributary of the Mureș in Mureș County
Deleni, a tributary of the Slănic in Buzău County
Deleni, a tributary of the Valea Baciului in Constanța County

See also 
 Dealu (disambiguation)
 Delureni (disambiguation)
 Deleanu (surname)